Jules Conrad Goldstone (1900–1980) was an entertainment attorney who took part in the early Hollywood antitrust suits.

Born to a Jewish family, Goldstone was a native of Schenectady, NY. He attended the University of Michigan Law School. Goldstone was an early Hollywood agent, representing Elizabeth Taylor, director Clarence Brown, and James Thurber, among others.

With his brothers, Charles and Nat Goldstone, he founded one of the earliest boutique Hollywood talent agencies (later the Goldstone & Tobias Agency).

Goldstone was the father of the film and television director James Goldstone.

References

1900 births
1980 deaths
20th-century American lawyers
20th-century American Jews
Talent managers
University of Michigan Law School alumni